Hesperisternia harasewychi is a species of sea snail, a marine gastropod mollusk in the family Pisaniidae.

Description
Original description: "Shell thin, inflated with elevated spire; 8 strong varices per whorl; body whorl ornamented with 4 large spiral cords; numerous fine threads between large cords; 4 large knobs per varix, produced by intersections of varix with spiral cord; siphonal canal short, stumpy, ornamented with numerous spiral threads; interior of aperture with large, well-developed plications on inner side of lip; suture incised, indented, producing scalariform effect; shell color bright yellow-orange, orange red, or salmon-pink; paratype (ANSP) with anterior half of body whorl bright pinkish-orange, posterior half bright yellow, producing two-toned color pattern; aperture and columella white."

Distribution
Locus typicus: "(Dredged from) 150 metres depth
50 kilometres South of Apalachicola, Florida, USA."

References

External links
  Rosenberg, G.; Moretzsohn, F.; García, E. F. (2009). Gastropoda (Mollusca) of the Gulf of Mexico, pp. 579–699 in: Felder, D.L. and D.K. Camp (eds.), Gulf of Mexico–Origins, Waters, and Biota. Texas A&M Press, College Station, Texas

Pisaniidae
Gastropods described in 1987